According to nielsen media statistics for 2015–2016, the Richmond, Virginia market area is the 56th largest Designated Market Area in the United States, with 549,730 TV households. Richmond is served by a variety of communication media:

Print media

Daily
The local daily newspaper in Richmond is the Richmond Times-Dispatch.

Weekly
Style Weekly  (alternative weekly)
Chesterfield Observer

Monthly / bi-monthly / quarterly 
NORTH of the JAMES Magazine (monthly)
Boomer Magazine (bi-monthly)
Chesterfield Living, West Ends Best, Hanover Lifestyle (bi-monthly)
Greater Richmond Grid Magazine  (bi-monthly)
OurHealth Richmond Magazine (bi-monthly)
Richmond Magazine  (monthly)
RVA Magazine (quarterly)
Virginia Business (monthly)
Whurk (monthly)

News and newsmagazines

The Richmond Free Press and the Richmond Voice  are weekly newspapers that cover the news from a predominantly African American perspective. The only Hispanic magazine in the state, La Voz Hispana de Virginia  provides significant cultural and news content in both English and Spanish.  There are also two major publications from the Jewish community of Richmond, published in English; The Reflector is the semi-weekly newspaper of the Jewish Federation of Richmond and Virginia Jewish Life (formerly Virginia Jewish News) is an independent monthly magazine published by the Chabad community of Richmond, but highlighting stories of general Jewish interest in Virginia.  City Edition was a civic-minded newspaper that listed municipal and council related events, issues, and results, which stopped publication in October 2007. . Richmond.com is an online newsmagazine with a wide readership. Other local topical publications include Richmond Parents Magazine and V Magazine for Women. the voice of women in Richmond.  Richmond Guide  is a quarterly that is targeted toward visitors. The Virginia Defender  is a quarterly statewide community newspaper with a press run of 16,000 distributed through nearly 300 distribution sites in Richmond, plus 16 other Virginia cities and five counties.

Richmond's leading African American newspaper at the turn of the century was the Richmond Planet which ran from 1883 to 1996 and was edited by John Mitchel, Jr. from 1884 until his death in 1929.

Regional and county newspapers include the following: 
 The Amelia Bulletin Monitor for Amelia County, Virginia 
  Capital News Service at VCU for regional and national news 
 The Chesterfield Observer for Chesterfield County, Virginia 
 The Goochland Courier for Goochland County, Virginia
 The Goochland Gazette for Goochland County, Virginia 
 The Henrico Citizen for Henrico County, Virginia 
 The Hopewell News (defunct) for Hopewell, Virginia 
 Petersburg Progress-Index for Petersburg, Virginia
 RVA Magazine 
 Virginia Living  is a glossy magazine published bi-monthly that covers Virginia events.

Student Operated 
Many colleges and universities in Richmond have student operated new services including The Richard T. Robertson School of Media and Culture at Virginia Commonwealth University, VCU Student Media, VUU, and University of Richmond. Examples of student operated media include VCU's Commonwealth Times, VCU Capital News Service and VCU InSight ','Ink, Amendment, Emanata, and Poictesme''.

Television 
Richmond is served by several television stations.

Broadcast
Richmond's over-the-air television stations:

** As of August, 2019, this station is indicated as Silent on the FCC's broadcast database.
 
Repack refers to the impending reallocation of channel assignments following FCC Auctions 1001/1002, which is designed to sell unused TV spectrum to wireless service operators.  Richmond-area stations will begin testing in January 2020, and will have to move to their new channels by March 13, 2020.

Primary station signals air on 2-3 channels per cable system (usually one in standard definition and 1–2 in high definition).  Subchannels are cleared on cable systems through contractual agreements, and are generally in standard definition.

Cable
Comcast is the primary cable television provider for the Richmond area (Richmond city proper, Chesterfield, Henrico County) and the Tri-Cities (area includes Petersburg, Colonial Heights, Hopewell and the counties of Dinwiddie and Prince George). In the city and Henrico County, it is the successor to the franchise originally held by Continental Cablevision, then MediaOne, then AT&T Broadband, before Comcast acquired AT&T Broadband. In Chesterfield, it is the successor to the franchise originally held by Storer Cable. In the nearby Tri-Cities area, it is the successor to the franchise originally held by Sammons Communications, then Marcus Cable, then Tele-Media, then Adelphia, before Comcast acquired Adelphia.

Verizon now offers television through its fiber-optic system, FiOS TV, in Richmond City and Henrico and Chesterfield Counties, and is currently expanding its services farther into the outlying Richmond area.

Radio 
The metropolitan area is served by a variety of radio stations, serving a wide variety of musical and other interests.

AM 
Several AM stations serve a variety of music, talk, and sports topics, including the following:

FM 
On the FM dial, popular music stations include the following:

HD Radio

Media corporations 
Commercial radio ownership in Richmond is dominated by three companies:

 Entercom  (WRVA-AM, WRVQ, WTVR-FM, WBTJ, WRXL, WRNL-AM)
 SummitMedia LLC  (WKLR, WMXB, WJSR, WKHK)
 Urban One  (WCDX, WKJS, WKJX, WPZZ, WTPS-AM)

Commonwealth Public Broadcasting Corporation is the owner of several stations in Richmond (WCVE-TV, WCVE-FM, WWLB-FM, WBBT-FM, WCVW-TV), along with translators in Charlottesville, and another station in Northern Virginia, and is headquartered in Richmond.

Communication schools
Richmond is home to the VCU School of Mass Communications, which was founded in 1978 and offers bachelor's and master's degrees in journalism, advertising and public relations. It  is accredited by the Accrediting Council on Education in Journalism and Mass Communication (AEJMC). The school houses Capital News Service, VCU InSight, and the VCU Create-A-thon.

See also
 Virginia media
 List of newspapers in Virginia
 List of radio stations in Virginia
 List of television stations in Virginia
 Media of cities in Virginia: Chesapeake, Hampton, Newport News, Norfolk, Roanoke, Virginia Beach

External links
 2005 Mediaweek review of Richmond-Petersburg Media
 www.nielsenmedia.com DMA rankings
  (Directory ceased in 2017)

Richmond